Colgan Air Flight 3407 (marketed as Continental Connection Flight 3407 under a codeshare agreement with Continental Airlines) was a scheduled passenger flight from Newark, New Jersey, to Buffalo, New York, which crashed on February 12, 2009. The aircraft, a Bombardier Q400, entered an aerodynamic stall from which it did not recover, and crashed into a house at 6038 Long Street in Clarence Center, New York, at 10:17 pm EST (03:17 UTC), killing all 49 passengers and crew on board, as well as one person inside the house.

The National Transportation Safety Board (NTSB) conducted the accident investigation and published a final report on Tuesday, February 2, 2010, which found the probable cause to be the pilots' inappropriate response to the stall warnings. Flight 3407 is the most recent aviation incident involving a U.S.-based airline that resulted in multiple casualties.

Families of the accident victims lobbied the U.S. Congress to enact more stringent regulations for regional carriers, and to improve the scrutiny of safe operating procedures and the working conditions of pilots. The Airline Safety and Federal Aviation Administrative Extension Act of 2010 (Public Law 111–216) required some of these regulation changes.

Flight details

Colgan Air Flight 3407 (9L/CJC 3407) was marketed as Continental Connection Flight 3407. It was delayed two hours, departing at 9:18 p.m. Eastern Standard Time (02:18 UTC), en route from Newark Liberty International Airport to Buffalo Niagara International Airport.

The aircraft involved was the twin-engine turboprop Bombardier Q400, registration N200WQ, was manufactured in February 2008 and was delivered to Colgan on April 16, 2008.

This was the first fatal accident for a Colgan Air passenger flight since the company was founded in 1991. One previous repositioning flight, with no passengers, crashed offshore of Cape Cod, Massachusetts, in August 2003, killing both of the crew on board. The only prior accident involving a Colgan Air passenger flight occurred at LaGuardia Airport, when another plane collided with the Colgan aircraft while taxiing, resulting in minor injuries to a flight attendant.

Captain Marvin Renslow, 47, of Lutz, Florida, was the pilot in command, and Rebecca Lynne Shaw, 24, of Maple Valley, Washington, served as the first officer. The cabin crew consisted of two flight attendants. Captain Renslow was hired in September 2005 and had accumulated 3,379 total flight hours, with 111 hours as captain on the Q400. First Officer Shaw was hired in January 2008, and had 2,244 hours, 774 of them in turbine aircraft, including the Q400.

Two Canadian passengers, one Chinese passenger, and one Israeli passenger were on board. The remaining 41 passengers, as well as the crew members, were American.

Crash

Shortly after the flight was cleared for an instrument landing system approach to runway 23 at Buffalo Niagara International Airport, it disappeared from radar. The deicing system had been turned on 11 minutes after takeoff. Shortly before the crash, the pilots discussed significant ice buildup on the aircraft's wings and windshield. Two other aircraft reported icing conditions around the time of the crash.

The last radio transmission from the flight occurred when the first officer acknowledged a routine instruction to change to tower radio frequency. The crash occurred 41 seconds after that last transmission. Since ATC approach control was unable to get any further response from the flight, the assistance of Delta Air Lines Flight 1998 and US Airways Flight 1452 was requested. Neither was able to spot the missing plane.

Following the clearance for final approach, landing gear and flaps (5°) were extended. The captain then called for the flaps to be increased to 15°. The captain responded by abruptly pulling back on the control column, followed by increasing thrust to 75% power, instead of lowering the nose and applying full power, which was the proper stall-recovery technique. That improper action pitched the nose up even further, increasing the g-load and increasing the stall speed. The stick pusher activated (The Q400 stick pusher applies an airplane-nose-down control column input to decrease the wing's angle of attack (AOA) after an aerodynamic stall), but the captain overrode the stick pusher and continued pulling back on the control column. The first officer retracted the flaps without consulting the captain, making recovery even more difficult.

In its final moments, the aircraft pitched up 31°, then pitched down 25°, then rolled left 46° and snapped back to the right at 105°. The aircraft burst into flames, as the fuel tanks ruptured on impact, destroying the house of Douglas and Karen Wielinski, and most of the plane. Douglas was killed; his wife Karen and their daughter Jill managed to escape with minor injuries. Very little damage occurred to surrounding homes,  though the lots in that area are only 60 ft (18.3 m) wide. The home was close to the Clarence Center Fire Company, so emergency personnel were able to respond quickly. Two firefighters were injured; 12 nearby houses were evacuated.

Victims

A total of 50 people perished, including the 49 passengers and crew on board when the aircraft was destroyed, and one resident of the house that was struck. Four injuries happened on the ground, including two other people inside the home at the time of the crash. Among the dead were:

 Alison Des Forges, a human rights investigator and an expert on the Rwandan genocide.
 Beverly Eckert, who had become co-chair of the 9/11 Family Steering Committee and a leader of Voices of September 11 after her husband Sean Rooney was killed in the September 11 attacks. Eckert was en route to Buffalo to celebrate her husband's 58th birthday and award a scholarship in his memory at Canisius High School.
 Gerry Niewood and Coleman Mellett, jazz musicians who were en route to a concert with Chuck Mangione and the Buffalo Philharmonic Orchestra.
 Susan Wehle, the first American female Jewish Renewal cantor.

Reactions
 Colgan Air set up a telephone number for families and friends of those affected to call on February 13, and a family assistance center was opened at the Cheektowaga Senior Center in Cheektowaga, New York. The American Red Cross also opened reception centers in Buffalo and Newark where family members could receive support from mental health and spiritual care workers.
 During the afternoon, the United States House of Representatives held a moment of silence for the victims and their families.
 Buffalo's professional ice hockey team, the Buffalo Sabres, held a moment of silence prior to their scheduled game the next night against the San Jose Sharks.
 The University at Buffalo, which lost in the crash 11 passengers who were former employees, faculty, or alumni, and 12 who were their family members, held a remembrance service on February 17, 2009. A band with the flight number was worn on UB players' uniforms for the remainder of the basketball season.
 Buffalo State College's 11th president, Muriel Howard, released a statement regarding the six alumni lost on Flight 3407. Beverly Eckert was a 1975 graduate from Buffalo State.
 On March 4, 2009, New York Governor David Paterson proposed the creation of a scholarship fund to benefit children and financial dependents of the 50 crash victims. The Flight 3407 Memorial Scholarship would cover costs for up to four years of undergraduate study at a SUNY or CUNY school, or a private college or university in New York.
 The accident was the basis for a PBS Frontline episode on the regional airline industry. Discussed in the episode were issues relating to regional airline regulation, training requirements, safety, and working conditions. Also discussed were the operating principles of regional airlines and the agreements between regional airlines and major airlines.

Investigation

The U.S. National Transportation Safety Board (NTSB) began their inquiry on February 13, with a team of 14 investigators.  Both the flight data recorder (FDR) and the cockpit voice recorder (CVR) were recovered and analyzed in Washington, DC.

Data extracted from the FDR revealed the aircraft went through severe pitch and roll oscillations shortly after the extension of flaps and landing gear, which was followed by the activation of the "stick shaker" stall-warning system. The aircraft fell , and then crashed on a northeast heading, opposite of the approach heading to the airport. Occupants experienced estimated accelerations of up to 2 g prior to impact.

Freezing temperatures made access to crash debris difficult. Portable heaters were used to melt ice left in the wake of the firefighting efforts. Human remains were carefully removed, and then finally identified, over a period of several weeks. The cockpit had sustained the greatest impact force, while the main cabin was mostly destroyed by the ensuing fire. Passengers in the rear section were still strapped in their seats.

The autopilot was in control until it automatically disconnected when the stall-warning stick shaker activated. The NTSB found no evidence of severe icing conditions, which would have required the pilots to fly manually. Colgan recommended its pilots to fly manually in icing conditions, and required them to do so in severe icing conditions. In December 2008, the NTSB issued a safety bulletin about the danger of keeping the autopilot engaged during icing conditions. Flying the plane manually was essential to ensure pilots would be able to detect changes in the handling characteristics of the airplane, which are warning signs of ice accumulation.

It was later determined that the stick shaker trigger had been set improperly and that the stick shaker should not have engaged at this point. After the captain reacted inappropriately to the stick shaker, the stick pusher activated. As designed, it pushed the nose down when it sensed a stall was imminent, but the captain again reacted improperly and overrode that additional safety device by pulling back again on the control column, causing the plane to stall and crash. Bill Voss, president of Flight Safety Foundation, told USA Today that it sounded like the plane was in "a deep stall situation".

On May 11, 2009, information was released about Captain Renslow's training record. According to an article in The Wall Street Journal, before joining Colgan, he had failed three "check rides", including some at Gulfstream International's training program, and "people close to the investigation" suggested that he might not have been adequately trained to respond to the emergency that led to the airplane's fatal descent. Investigators examined possible crew fatigue. The captain appeared to have been at Newark airport overnight, prior to the day of the 9:18 p.m. departure of the accident flight. The first officer commuted from Seattle to Newark on an overnight flight. These findings during the investigation led the FAA to issue a "Call to Action" for improvements in the practices of regional carriers.

Another press report said that the captain had failed five prior tests, and also alleged "flirtatious" conversation in the cockpit between the captain and the much younger first officer.

In response to questioning from the NTSB, Colgan Air officials acknowledged both pilots apparently were not paying close attention to the aircraft's instruments, and did not properly follow the airline's procedures for handling an impending stall. "I believe Capt. Renslow did have intentions of landing safely at Buffalo, as well as first officer Shaw, but obviously in those last few moments ... the flight instruments were not being monitored, and that's an indication of a lack of situational awareness," said John Barrett, Colgan's director of flight standards.

The official transcript of the crew's communication, obtained from the CVR, as well as an animated depiction of the crash, constructed using data from the FDR, were made available to the public on May 12, 2009. Some of the crew's communication violated federal rules banning nonessential conversation.

On June 3, 2009, The New York Times published an article detailing complaints about Colgan's operations from an FAA inspector who observed test flights in January 2008.  As in a previous FAA incident handling other inspectors' complaints, the Colgan inspector's complaints were deferred and the inspector was demoted. The incident was under investigation by the Office of Special Counsel (OSC), the agency responsible for U.S. Government federal whistle-blower complaints. On August 5, 2009, the OSC released a report stating that the inspector's removal from the Colgan inspection team was proper.

Final report
On February 2, 2010, the NTSB issued its final report, describing the details of its investigation that led to 46 specific conclusions.

One conclusion determined that both the captain and the first officer were fatigued at the time of the accident, but the NTSB could not determine how much it degraded their performance.

Among those conclusions were the fact that both the captain and the first officer responded to the stall warning in a manner contrary to their training. The NTSB could not explain why the first officer retracted the flaps and suggested that the landing gear should also be retracted, though it did find that the current approach-stall training was not adequate:

Those findings were immediately followed by the board's "Probable Cause" statement:

NTSB Chairman Deborah Hersman, while concurring, made it clear that she considered fatigue to be a contributing factor. She compared the 20 years that fatigue had remained on the NTSB's Most Wanted List of transportation safety improvements, during which  no meaningful action was taken by regulators in response, to the changes in tolerance for alcohol over the same period, noting that the impact on performance from fatigue and alcohol were similar.

However, Vice Chairman Christopher A. Hart and Board Member Robert L. Sumwalt III did not agree with Hersman regarding the inclusion of fatigue as a contributing factor, on the grounds that evidence was insufficient to support such a conclusion. Notably, the same kind of pilot errors and standard operating procedure violations had been found in other accidents where fatigue was not a factor.

Legacy
The FAA proposed or implemented several rule changes as a result of the Flight 3407 accident, including:
 Revised pilot fatigue rules
 A rule change requiring all airline pilots (both captain and first officer) to hold Airline Transport Pilot (ATP) certificates, which effectively increased the minimum experience for first officers from 250 hours to in most cases 1,500 hours of flight experience. (This rule would not have influenced the crew in this accident, as both pilots held ATP certificates and had more than 1,500 hours of experience.) 
 A change in the way examiners grade checkrides in flight simulators during stalls.
 Investigators also scrutinized the Practical Test Standards  for ATP certification, which allowed for an altitude loss of no more than 100 ft (30 m) in a simulated stall. The NTSB theorized that due to this low tolerance in a tested simulation environment, pilots may have come to fear loss of altitude in a stall, and thus focused primarily on preventing such a loss, even to the detriment of recovering from the stall itself. New standards subsequently issued by the FAA eliminate any specific altitude loss stipulation, calling instead for "minimal loss of elevation" in a stall. One examiner has told an aviation magazine that he is not allowed to fail any applicant for losing altitude in a simulated stall, so long as the pilot is able to regain the original altitude.
 The NTSB issued safety recommendations to the FAA to strengthen the way airlines check into the background of pilot applicants, including requiring previous employers to disclose training records and records of any previous failures. Congress took note of these recommendations and included them in an August 2010 amendment to the Pilot Record Improvement Act (PRIA) requiring the FAA to record training failures in a national Pilot Records Database (PRD) which would aid airlines in identifying pilot applicants like Captain Renslow, who had multiple training failures at different airlines during his career.

Congress appropriated $24 million to help facilitate creation of the PRD. But eleven years later, despite lobbying by a group of relatives of crash victims, the FAA had still not completed the PRD as directed by the NTSB. It was not until May 2021 that the FAA introduced the PRD. The FAA's page about the PRD says:

In February 2019, to mark the 10th anniversary of the crash, ceremonies were held in Buffalo and the surrounding area in remembrance of the victims.

In popular culture
The Cineflix/National Geographic series Mayday featured the incident in the fourth episode of season 10, titled "Dead Tired". The dramatization was broadcast with the title "Stalled in the Sky" in the United Kingdom.

The flight was also included in a Mayday: The Accident Files season two (2019) special titled "Rookie Errors", which looked at the role of inexperienced pilots in aviation disasters.

See also

Icing conditions in aviation
United Express Flight 6291 — a similar accident caused by an aerodynamic stall

References

External links

Cockpit Voice Recorder transcript and accident summary
Flight 3407 Information — Colgan Air (Archive)
Website created and maintained by family members and close friends of victims who perished onboard flight 3407 (Archive)
NTSB Computer simulation of last 2 minutes of flight 3407, National Transportation Safety Board
NTSB Public hearing, May 12–14, 2009. (Includes webcast of complete hearing)
NTSB investigation docket with all relevant documents, including Flight Data Recorder data and Cockpit Voice Recorder transcript.
Flight path for CJC3407 in 3D/Google Earth at flightwise.com (Archive)
Flight track data for Continental Connection flight 3407 at flightwise.com
Information Regarding Flight 3407 — Continental Airlines (Archive)
Flight tracker and Track log
 Flickr photo set of the crash
 Pre-crash phots of N200WQ.
 After Sept. 11, 'He Wanted Me To Live A Full Life' (about victim Beverly Eckert) from NPR radio
 Buffalo Crash Puts Focus On Regional Airlines from NPR radio
 Frontline (American TV program) — Flying Cheap — February 9, 2010. One year after the deadly crash of Continental 3407, FRONTLINE investigate the safety issues associated with regional airlines.
Track log for Continental Connection flight 3407 (CJC3407) at flightwise.com

2009 in New York (state)
Accidents and incidents involving the De Havilland Canada Dash 8
Airliner accidents and incidents caused by pilot error
Airliner accidents and incidents in New York (state)
Articles containing video clips
Aviation accidents and incidents in the United States in 2009
3407
Erie County, New York
History of Buffalo, New York
University at Buffalo
February 2009 events in the United States
Aviation accidents and incidents in 2009
Colgan Air accidents and incidents
Airliner accidents and incidents caused by stalls